The president of the European Central Bank  is the head of the European Central Bank (ECB), the main institution responsible for the management of the euro and monetary policy in the Eurozone of the European Union (EU).

The current president of the European Central Bank is Christine Lagarde, previously the chair and managing director of the International Monetary Fund. Lagarde has served as the president of the ECB since 1 November 2019. She is the first woman to hold the post.

Role and appointment

The president heads the executive board, Governing Council and General Council of the ECB, and represents the bank abroad, for example at the G20. The officeholder is appointed by a qualified majority vote of the European Council, de facto by those who have adopted the euro, for an eight-year non-renewable term.

History

Duisenberg

Wim Duisenberg was President of the European Monetary Institute (EMI) when it became the ECB, just prior to the launch of the Euro, on 1 June 1998. Duisenberg then became the first President of the ECB.

The French interpretation of the agreement made with the installation of Wim Duisenberg as ECB President was that Duisenberg would resign after just four years of his eight-year term, and would be replaced by the Frenchman Jean-Claude Trichet. Duisenberg always strongly denied that such an agreement was made and stated in February 2002 that he would stay in office until his 68th birthday on 9 July 2003.

In the meanwhile Jean-Claude Trichet was not cleared of legal accusations before 1 June 2002, so he was not able to begin his term after Duisenberg's first four years. Even on 9 July 2003 Trichet was not cleared, and therefore Duisenberg remained in office until 1 November 2003. Duisenberg died on 31 July 2005.

Trichet

Jean-Claude Trichet became president in 2003 and served during the European sovereign debt crisis. Trichet's strengths lay in keeping consensus and visible calm in the ECB. During his tenure, Trichet has had to fend off criticism from French President Nicolas Sarkozy who demanded a more growth-orientated policy at the ECB. Germany Chancellor Angela Merkel supported Trichet in demanding the bank's independence be respected.

However, he was also criticised from straying from his mandate during the crisis by buying the government bonds of eurozone member states. ECB board members Axel A. Weber and Jürgen Stark resigned in protest at this policy, even if it helped prevent states from defaulting. IMF economist Pau Rabanal argued that Trichet "maintained a relatively expansionary monetary policy," but even "sacrificed the ECB's inflation target for the sake of greater economic growth and jobs creation, and not the other way round." While straying from his mandate, he has however still kept interest rates under control and maintained greater price stability than the Deutsche Bundesbank did before the euro.

As well as defending the ECB's independence and balancing its commitment to interest rates and economic stability, Trichet also fought Sarkozy for automatic sanctions in the EU fiscal reforms and opposite Merkel's against private sector involvement in bail outs so as not to scare the markets. He had however made some mistakes during the crisis, for example by: raising interest rates just after inflation topped out and just prior to the recession triggered by the Lehman Brothers collapse; also by its early timidity in buying eurozone state bonds.

In his final appearance (his 35th) before the European Parliament, Trichet called for more political unity, including; significant new powers to be granted to the ECB, the establishment of an executive branch with a European Finance Ministry and greater oversight powers for the European Parliament. He also asserted that the ECB's role in maintaining price stability throughout the financial crisis and the oil price rises should not be overlooked. He stated, in response to a question from a German newspaper attacking the ECB's credibility following its bond-buying;

Draghi

Although Axel Weber was tipped as one of the possible successors, he resigned from the ECB in protest at the bail out policies. Mario Draghi was chosen to become the next President of the ECB on 24 June 2011. Draghi was president from 1 November 2011 until 31 October 2019 (succeeded by Christine Lagarde).

Pascal Canfin, Member of the European Parliament for France, asserted that Draghi had been involved in swaps for European governments, namely Greece, trying to disguise their countries' economic status. Draghi responded that the deals were "undertaken before my joining Goldman Sachs [and] I had nothing to do with" them, in the 2011 European Parliament nomination hearings.

In December 2011, Draghi oversaw a €489 billion ($640 billion), three-year loan program from the ECB to European banks. The program was around the same size as the US Troubled Asset Relief Program (2008) though still much smaller than the overall US response including the Federal Reserve's asset purchases and other actions of that time.

In February, 2012, a second, somewhat larger round of ECB loans to European banks was initiated under Draghi, called long term refinancing operation (LTRO). One commentator, Matthew Lynn, saw the ECB's injection of funds, along with Quantitative easing from the US Fed and the Asset Purchase Facility at the Bank of England, as feeding increases in oil prices in 2011 and 2012.

In July 2012, in the midst of renewed fears about sovereigns in the eurozone, Draghi stated in a panel discussion that the ECB "...is ready to do whatever it takes to preserve the Euro. And believe me, it will be enough." This statement led to a steady decline in bond yields (borrowing costs) for eurozone countries, in particular Spain, Italy and France. In light of slow political progress on solving the eurozone crisis, Draghi's statement has been seen as a key turning point in the fortunes of the Eurozone.

List

Presidents

Vice presidents

References

External links
 Organisation of the ECB
 President's CV
 EU Treaties; Section 6 Article 282 on ECB

European Central Bank
 
Eurogroup
European Union